Annette Susanne Strøyberg (7 December 1936 – 12 December 2005) was a Danish actress. Her films included Les Liaisons dangereuses (1959), which was directed by her first husband, Roger Vadim.

Biography
Annette Strøyberg was born on either 12 December 1934 or
7 December 1936 in the village of Rynkeby, Kerteminde Municipality, Denmark, and is related to Danish actress Camilla Soeberg as the cousin of Camilla's mother. Prior to 1958, Strøyberg appeared as a cover girl, most notably in an advertisement for Tuborg beer. In 1959, she appeared in the film Les Liaisons dangereuses, directed by Roger Vadim, starring Gérard Philipe and Jeanne Moreau. During this production, she and Roger Vadim, a recent divorcé from Brigitte Bardot, fell in love and married on 17 June 1958. Before their marriage, on 7 December 1957, she gave birth to Nathalie Vadim, who went on to be a film director.

Subsequently, she appeared in a series of mostly very poorly rated entertainment films of Italian or French provenance, which revealed her lack of acting talent. In a review of those years, the German publication Die Zeit called Stroyberg's acting "unbearably exalted".

Strøyberg and Vadim divorced in 1961. She lived with Vittorio Gassman for a couple of years, and had liaisons with Alain Delon, Omar Sharif and Warren Beatty. In 1967, Strøyberg married French-Moroccan sugar king Guy Senouf. They had a son, Yan (born 27 June 1967). The couple enrolled at the Sorbonne and divided their time between Paris and north Africa. In 1974, she married Greek shipping magnate Gregory Callimanopulos in New York City. They had a son, Pericles (born 20 July 1974) and settled for a time in America.

In February 1986, former husband Vadim published Bardot, Deneuve, Fonda -- My Life With the Three Most Beautiful Women in the World, a book about Vadim's relationships in which Strøyberg is written as passing "in and out of the other four lives" such that there is at least as much in the book about Strøyberg as the three women named in the book title. After the break-up of her relationship with Callimanopulos in the early 1990s, she returned to Europe, living in Paris and Copenhagen, where she was part of the circle around Margrethe II of Denmark and Prince Henrik. She married a fourth and final time to Christian Lillelund, an attorney, in 2001.

Death
She died of cancer in Copenhagen, Denmark, on 12 December 2005, five days after her 69th birthday. She was survived by her husband and three children.

Selected filmography
Les Liaisons dangereuses (1959)
 Blood and Roses (1960)
 I Don Giovanni della Costa Azzurra (1962)
 Lo scippo (1963)

References

External links
 

1936 births
2005 deaths
Deaths from cancer in Denmark
Danish film actresses
People from Kerteminde Municipality